Loricera pilicornis is a species of ground beetle native to Europe.
It is found in shady places near water.

References

Loricera
Beetles described in 1775
Taxa named by Johan Christian Fabricius
Beetles of Europe